Zitouni is a Maghrebian surname. Notable people with the surname include: 

Ahmed Zitouni (born 1949), Algerian writer 
Ali Zitouni (born 1981), Tunisian football player 
Djamel Zitouni (1964-1996), leader of the Algerian Armed Islamic Group (terrorist group) 
Malika Zitouni (born 1973), French-Algerian bodybuilder 
Mustapha Zitouni (1928–2014), French-Algerian football player